Cindy O'Laughlin is an American politician. She was elected to Missouri's 18th Senatorial District in 2018.

Prior to being elected to the Missouri Senate, O’Laughlin served as a member of the Shelby County R-IV School District and the Treasurer of the Missouri Club for Growth.

Missouri Senate
In October 2017, O’Laughlin announced her candidacy for state senate. She won the Republican primary against three other candidates. She successfully ran against Democrat Crystal Stevens in the November election.

O’Laughlin serves as the chair of the Missouri Senate Committee on Education and also the Missouri General Assembly’s Joint Committee on Education.

Tenure
On July 6, 2021, O'Laughlin visited the Schuyler County Courthouse in Lancaster. The goal of the visit was to let residents talk about current Missouri issues. Topics brought up included gun rights, broadband and road infrastructure. Residents also talked about Medicaid, which had been approved by Missouri the previous month.

Healthcare
O’Laughlin was an early opponent of state and national lockdowns as it related to the COVID-19 pandemic and advocated for the state to allow visitors to return to nursing homes. An editorial by The Kansas City Star called her advice “dangerous.”

In 2022, she opposed the Joe Biden administration's COVID-19 vaccine requirements for health care workers.

Education
O’Laughlin serves as the chair of the Missouri Senate Committee on Education and also the Missouri General Assembly’s Joint Committee on Education. She has sponsored legislation to expand charter schools and is a supporter of school choice. Prior to being elected to the Missouri Senate, O’Laughlin served as a member of the school board at her local public school and as an administrator at a local private school.

In 2020, O’Laughlin sponsored legislation to require transgender high school athletes to compete based on their assigned sex at birth.

Personal life
O’Laughlin has served as the Vice President of Leo O’Laughlin, Inc. for nearly three decades. She and her husband own and operate a trucking company and ready-mix concrete business with Missouri locations in Shelbina, Macon, Marceline and La Belle. O’Laughlin has been a member of various civic organizations such as the Shelby County Chamber of Commerce & Industry and the Shelby County Economic Development Board. She has also served on numerous statewide boards, such as the Associated Builders and Contractors and the Missouri Club for Growth.



Electoral history

2018 Primary

2018 General Election

2022 General Election

References

21st-century American politicians
21st-century American women politicians
Living people
Republican Party Missouri state senators
Women state legislators in Missouri
Year of birth missing (living people)